Ein Landarzt (A Country Doctor) is a one-act chamber opera composed by Hans Werner Henze. The libretto was written by Henze and is closely based on Kafka's 1917 short story "Ein Landarzt". The work was originally composed as a radio opera and was premiered on 19 November 1951 in a broadcast by Nordwestdeutscher Rundfunk. Henze subsequently revised the work in 1964 both as a monodrama for baritone and chamber orchestra and as a one-act staged opera. The stage version was premiered by the Oper Frankfurt on 30 November 1965.

Background and performance history

Radio opera version
The original version of Ein Landarzt  was composed specifically for radio performance and was a commission from the German public radio network Nordwestdeutscher Rundfunk (NWDR). It premiered as an NWDR radio broadcast from Hamburg on 19 November 1951 with Hans Herbert Fiedler in the title role and  conducting the NWDR Symphony Orchestra. In 1953 the opera was entered in the Prix Italia where it received the Premio RAI. Henze reworked the opera into two further versions in 1964, a monodrama and a stage version. The original radio opera was itself revised by Henze in 1994 with a narrator added and some of the original radiophonic effects removed from the score. This revised version premiered in a Westdeutscher Rundfunk (WDR) broadcast from Cologne on 27 September 1996  with Roland Hermann in the title role and Markus Stenz conducting the WDR Symphony Orchestra. Henze himself took the role of narrator. The 1996 performance was subsequently released on CD in 2005 coupled with another one-act opera by Henze, Das Ende einer Welt.

Monodrama version
In 1964, Henze reworked the radio opera version as a vehicle for Dietrich Fischer-Dieskau. This version, scored for solo baritone and chamber orchestra, was premiered by Fischer-Dieskau in a performance in Berlin on 13 October 1965 with Henze conducting the Berlin Philharmonic. This version in English translation as A Country Doctor was performed in a semi-staged production at London's St. Pancras Arts Festival in 1966. The monodrama was revived by the Guildhall School of Music and Drama on 8 June 2015, again in a semi-staged production, with Martin Hässler in the title role and Timothy Redmond conducting the Guildhall Orchestra.

Stage version
The stage version, re-worked from the radio opera by Henze in 1964, premiered at the Oper Frankfurt on 30 November 1965 in a double bill with the premiere of his Das Ende einer Welt. The production was designed and directed by Hans Neugebauer with Ernst Gutstein in the title role and Wolfgang Rennert conducting. Its US premiere was in 1968 at the Aspen Music Festival performed in English translation as A Country Doctor. Later performances include Amsterdam (1970), Angers (1971), Hobart (1974), and Munich (2006).

Synopsis
A country doctor is summoned to a house 10 miles away where a young boy is seriously ill. He asks his maid Rosa to find him a horse, but she returns unsuccessful. A mysterious stable boy appears bringing a team of fine horses and promptly assaults Rosa, kissing and biting her. The doctor is magically transported to the patient's house by the horses but is deeply troubled by having left Rosa in the hands of the boorish stable boy. The young patient, who has a deep wound in his side, begs the doctor to let him die. The boy's family forcibly undress the doctor and make him lie in the boy's bed, threatening to kill him if the boy is not healed. The doctor manages to escape on one of the horses but, as if in a nightmare, finds himself unable to return home and condemned to travel for eternity.

Roles

Notes

References

Adaptations of works by Franz Kafka
Operas
1951 operas
1965 operas
German-language operas
Operas by Hans Werner Henze
One-act operas
Radio operas